The Charleston Promise Neighborhood is a non-profit organization based in Charleston, South Carolina modeled after the highly successful Harlem Children's Zone project. The Charleston Promise Neighborhood was incorporated May 12, 2010 and aims to break the cycle of poverty affecting parts of Charleston's East Side, Neck and North Charleston areas.

The Charleston Promise Neighborhood:

 Serves the entire neighborhood comprehensively and at scale
 Builds a pipeline of support–a seamless network of educational and socially conscious programs
 Builds a sense of community among residents, institutions and stakeholders
 Evaluates program outcomes
 Cultivates a culture of success rooted in passion, accountability, leadership and teamwork

External links
Official web site: http://www.charlestonpromise.org

Organizations based in Charleston, South Carolina
Non-profit organizations based in South Carolina
Organizations established in 2010
2010 establishments in South Carolina